The Dallas Chaparrals were a charter member of the American Basketball Association (ABA). The team moved to San Antonio, Texas for the 1973–74 season and were renamed the San Antonio Spurs. The Spurs joined the National Basketball Association (NBA) for the 1976–77 NBA season as a result of being one of four chosen ABA teams to be absorbed by the elder league following the completion of the ABA–NBA merger.

Origin
The team's founding owners, unable to agree on a name for the franchise during an early organizational meeting at the Sheraton Dallas Hotel, named it for the Chaparral Club in which they were meeting at. The team drew poor attendance and general disinterest in Dallas. They were lucky to attract crowds in the hundreds. During the 1970–71 season, the team became the Texas Chaparrals and an attempt was made to make the team a regional one, playing games in Fort Worth, at the Tarrant County Coliseum, as well as Lubbock, at the Lubbock Municipal Coliseum, but this proved a failure and the team returned full-time to Dallas in time for the 1971–72 season, splitting their games at Moody Coliseum and Dallas Convention Center Arena.

Decline and the move
After missing the playoffs for the first time in their existence in the 1972–73 season, the team was put up for sale. After no credible offers surfaced, the team's original owners leased it to a group of 35 San Antonio businessmen, led by Angelo Drossos and Red McCombs. The deal included a three-year option to buy the team outright, after which it would revert to the Dallas group. The Drossos-McCombs group moved the team to San Antonio for the 1973–74 season and renamed them the San Antonio Spurs. San Antonio embraced its new team with open arms; the Spurs surpassed the Chaparrals' entire 1972–73 attendance in only 16 games. Realizing they had a runaway hit on their hands, Drossos and McCombs tore up the lease and completed the purchase after only one year, and the franchise has stayed in San Antonio to this day.

However, Dallas would get its own NBA franchise in the form of the expansion Mavericks, who began play in the 1980-81 season.

Legacy
The Chaparrals' road uniform was featured in NBA Live 2004 as a hidden jersey. The Spurs wore the Chaparrals uniform in selected games in the 2011–12 NBA season prior to the 45th Anniversary of the ABA.

Basketball Hall of Famers

Notes:
 1 Also served as head coach (1967–1970).

Season-by-season

|-
|colspan="6" align=center style="background:#006BB6; color:#FFFFFF; border:2px solid #ED174C;"| Dallas Chaparrals
|-
|1967–68 || 46 || 32 || .590 || Won Division SemifinalsLost Semifinals || Dallas 3, Houston 0New Orleans 4, Dallas 1
|-
|1968–69 || 41 || 37 || .526 ||  Lost Division Semifinals || New Orleans 4, Dallas 3
|-
|1969–70 || 45 || 39 || .512 ||  Lost Division Semifinals || Utah 4, Dallas 2
|-
|colspan="6" align=center style="background:#006BB6; color:#FFFFFF; border:2px solid #ED174C;"| Texas Chaparrals
|-
|1970–71 || 30 || 54 || .357 || Lost Division Semifinals || Utah 4, Texas 0
|-
|colspan="6" align=center style="background:#006BB6; color:#FFFFFF; border:2px solid #ED174C;"| Dallas Chaparrals
|-
|1971–72 || 42 || 42 || .500 ||  Lost Division Semifinals || Utah 4, Dallas 0
|-
|1972–73 || 28 || 56 || .333 || colspan=2|Did not qualify 
|-

See also
 Bill Blakeley
 San Antonio Spurs

References

External links
 Dallas Chaparrals on RememberTheABA.com

 
American Basketball Association teams
Basketball teams established in 1967
Defunct basketball teams in Texas
1967 establishments in Texas
1973 disestablishments in Texas
Sports teams in the Dallas–Fort Worth metroplex
Basketball teams in Dallas
Basketball teams disestablished in 1973